Parascombrops analis, the threespine seabass, is a species of perciform fish in the family Acropomatidae.

Distribution 
They can be found in the Northwestern Pacific off southern Japan, Taiwan and the northern Philippines and Southwestern Pacific from the Coral Sea to Vanuatu.

References

analis
Fish described in 1957